Henderson Building is a historic administration building located on the campus of Southwestern Virginia Mental Health Institute at Marion, Smyth County, Virginia. It was built in 1887 in the Victorian style and remodeled in 1930–1931, in the Classical Revival style. When built, it was a four-story, brick building with a 118-foot clock tower.  With the 1930-1931 remodeling, The tower was removed and replaced with an octagonal rotunda and the building reduced to three stories.  A two-story front portico was also added.  In accordance with the Kirkbride Plan, the building was once connected to three
radiating three story ward wings.  The wings were replaced in the 1980s.

It was listed on the National Register of Historic Places in 1990.

References

Hospital buildings on the National Register of Historic Places in Virginia
Victorian architecture in Virginia
Neoclassical architecture in Virginia
University and college buildings completed in 1931
Buildings and structures in Smyth County, Virginia
National Register of Historic Places in Smyth County, Virginia
1887 establishments in Virginia